Cryptoblabes gnidiella, the honeydew moth or Christmasberry moth, is a moth of the family Pyralidae. It is natively found around the Mediterranean Sea but occurs also in Africa (South Africa, Réunion, Madagascar, Ghana), the Oriental & Australasian region (Australia, Hawaii, New Guinea) and is an introduced species in South America and Middle America.

The wingspan is 11–20 mm. The caterpillars feed on oranges and other types of citrus fruit, apple and maize. The adults feed on honeydew, and their association with the Christmasberry (Brazilian pepper, Schinus terebinthifolius) seems to be mainly for that reason.

This species has been reported from several dozen host plants, including many cultivated plants, especially fruits (e.g. grapes, lemons, and pomegranates). It is considered a serious pest together with accompanying insects.

References

2. Dawidowicz, Łukasz & Rozwałka, Robert. (2016). POLISH JOURNAL OF ENTOMOLOGY Honeydew Moth Cryptoblabes gnidiella (MILLIÈRE, 1867) (Lepidoptera: Pyralidae): an adventive species frequently imported with fruit to Poland. Polish Journal of Entomology. 85. 10.1515/pjen-2016-0010.

External links
Cryptoblabes gnidiella and C. aliena

Moths described in 1867
Cryptoblabini
Moths of Japan
Moths of Europe
Moths of Réunion
Moths of New Zealand
Moths of Asia
Moths of Africa
Insect pests of millets
Moths of Madagascar